is the 6th single by the Japanese idol girl group Onyanko Club. It was released in Japan on November 1, 1986. This song is considered one of Onyanko Club's most accomplished works.

Track listing

Charts

Weekly charts

References 

Onyanko Club songs
1986 songs
1986 singles
Songs with lyrics by Yasushi Akimoto
Pony Canyon singles
Oricon Weekly number-one singles